Lonapegsomatropin, sold under the brand name Skytrofa, is a human growth hormone used for the treatment of growth hormone deficiency. Lonapegsomatropin is a prodrug of somatropin.

Lonapegsomatropin was approved for medical use in the United States in August 2021, and in the European Union in January 2022.

Medical uses
Lonapegsomatropin is a growth hormone therapy indicated to treat growth hormone deficiency.

History 
The US Food and Drug Administration granted the application for lonapegsomatropin orphan drug designation.

References

Further reading

External links
 
 

Growth hormones
Orphan drugs